Graham Rees (18 April 1936 – July 1987) was a Welsh rugby union, and professional rugby league footballer who played in the 1960s and 1970s.

Background
Graham Rees was born in Maesteg, Wales, and he died aged 51 in Prestwich, Greater Manchester, England.

Playing career

International honours
Graham Rees won caps for Wales (RL) while at St. Helens 1968-70 - 4-caps.

Challenge Cup Final appearances
Graham Rees played left-, i.e. number 8, and scored a try in St. Helens' 16-13 victory over Leeds in the 1972 Challenge Cup Final during the 1971-72 season at Wembley Stadium, London on Saturday 13 May 1972. Graham Rees scored the quickest Challenge Cup Final try in 35 seconds for St Helens in 1972.

County Cup Final appearances
Graham Rees played left-, i.e. number 11, in Swinton's 4-12 defeat by St. Helens in the 1964 Lancashire County Cup Final during the 1964–65 season at Central Park, Wigan on Saturday 24 October 1964, played left-, and scored a try in St. Helens' 30-2 victory over Oldham in the 1968 Lancashire County Cup Final during the 1968–69 season at Central Park, Wigan on Friday 25 October 1968, and played right-, i.e. number 10, in the 4-7 defeat by Leigh in the 1970 Lancashire County Cup Final during the 1970–71 season at Station Road, Swinton on Saturday 28 November 1970.

BBC2 Floodlit Trophy Final appearances
Graham Rees played left-, i.e. number 11, in Swinton's 2-7 defeat by Castleford in the 1966 BBC2 Floodlit Trophy Final during the 1966–67 season at Wheldon Road, Castleford on Tuesday 20 December 1966, played left-, i.e. number 8, in St. Helens' 5-9 defeat by Leeds in the 1970 BBC2 Floodlit Trophy Final during the 1966–67 season at Headingley Rugby Stadium, Castleford on Tuesday 15 December 1970, and played left- in the 8-2 victory over Rochdale Hornets in the 1971 BBC2 Floodlit Trophy Final during the 1971–72 season at Knowsley Road, St. Helens on Tuesday 14 December 1971.

Death
On 1 August 1987, it was reported that Rees had died following a collapse shortly after playing squash at a club in Prestwich.

References

External links

1936 births
1987 deaths
Maesteg RFC players
Rugby league locks
Rugby league players from Maesteg
Rugby league props
Rugby league second-rows
Rugby union players from Maesteg
Salford Red Devils players
St Helens R.F.C. players
Swinton Lions players
Wales national rugby league team players
Welsh rugby league players
Welsh rugby union players